Christopher David Walsh (born 6 November 1975) is a former English cricketer.  Walsh is a right-handed batsman who bowls leg break. He was born at Pembury, Kent.

Walsh made his first-class debut for Kent against Oxford University in 1996.  From 1996 to 1998, he represented Kent in 4 first-class matches, with his final appearance for the county coming against Northamptonshire.

In 2000, Walsh joined Cambridgeshire, where he made his debut for the county  in his only List-A appearance, which came Cumberland.

He also represented the county in the Minor Counties Championship, where he made his debut for the county in that competition against Cumberland. He represented the county in 2 further Minor Counties matches against Buckinghamshire and Norfolk.

Family
His father David represented Cambridge University in first-class cricket.

References

External links
 

1975 births
Living people
People from Pembury
English cricketers
Kent cricketers
Cambridgeshire cricketers